625 Lineas was a program broadcast on La Primera Cadena of Televisión Española on Sunday afternoons from November 18, 1976 to April 5, 1981. It provided interviews with television celebrities and reviewed television shows airing on Televisión Española's channels. It also included musical numbers and humour.

The program's name is a reference to the 625 lines that make up the television image used in most of Europe and parts of Africa, Asia and Oceania under the PAL system (as opposed to the 525 lines used in North, Central and parts of South America and Asia under the NTSC system).

History 
The show was created by Jose Antonio Plaza, a Spanish journalist and television director. Plaza directed, and hosted with Paca Gabaldon and, later, with Mayra Gomez Kemp. The show achieved a solid level of success. In 1977 Plaza gave up his hosting duties to Juan Santamaria in order to focus on directing.

Two years later, Plaza added a new dimension to the program and hired Tony Saez, a young Canadian of Spanish descent, to coordinate interviews with actors on American television shows airing on Televisión Española. Among those who appeared during this phase of the program's history were stars from Michael Landon's popular NBC series Little House on the Prairie, Melissa Sue Anderson (Mary Ingalls) and Katherine MacGregor (Harriet Oleson).

From 1979 until 1981 the show was hosted by Marisa Abad, Isabel Borondo, Eva Gloria, Marisa Medina, Elena Gutiérrez and Santiago Peláez.

Awards 
 Premio Ondas (1978).
 TP de Oro (1977 y 1978) for Tip y Coll as Most Popular Personalities.
 TP de Oro (1978) a Mayra Gómez Kemp, as Best Host.

References 
El País, 23 November 1998 http://elpais.com/diario/1998/11/23/agenda/911775601_850215.html

1976 Spanish television series debuts
1981 Spanish television series endings
1970s Spanish television series
1980s Spanish television series
RTVE shows